Samastipur Lok Sabha constituency is one of the 40 Lok Sabha (parliamentary) constituencies in Bihar state in eastern India. It is reserved for Scheduled Castes.

Vidhan Sabha segments
Samastipur Lok Sabha constituency comprises the following six Vidhan Sabha (legislative assembly) segments:

Members of Parliament

^ by-poll

General elections

General election 2019

General election 2014

See also
 List of Constituencies of the Lok Sabha
 Samastipur district

References

Lok Sabha constituencies in Bihar
Politics of Samastipur district
Politics of Darbhanga district
Samastipur